Jovelina Pérola Negra (July 21, 1944 – November 2, 1998), stage name of Jovelina Farias Belfort, was a Brazilian samba singer and songwriter. Known by her deep voice, she was a representative of the partido alto samba style, and considered an heir to Clementina de Jesus style of singing.

Biography 
Jovelina was born in Rio de Janeiro, at the Botafogo neighbourhood and raised in Belford Roxo. She worked as a housemaid until her forties and was a member of the samba school Império Serrano.

Jovelina debuted to fame presenting at the Vegas Sport Clube, in the Coelho Neto neighborhood; her friend Dejalmir gave her stage name Jovelina Pérola Negra (Jovelina Black Pearl).

She recorded five individual albums, earning a platinum certificate, and a number of compilations. Some of her recorded songs are "Feirinha da Pavuna", "Bagaço da Laranja" (with Zeca Pagodinho), "Luz do Repente", "No Mesmo Manto" and  "Garota Zona Sul". Success came late in her life and she did not fulfill her dream of "earning a lot of money and giving her children everything she didn't have".

Jovelina died on November 2, 1998, at age 54, from a heart attack in her home in Pechincha.

Honours
She was posthumously awarded the Order of Cultural Merit by the Brazilian Ministry of Culture in 2016. Her name was given to the Arena Carioca Jovelina Pérola Negra cultural center, in the Pavuna neighbourhood of Rio.

Discography

References

External links 

 Jovelina Pérola Negra em Dicionário Cravo Albin da Música Popular Brasileira

Afro-Brazilian women singers
1998 deaths
1944 births
Samba musicians
Musicians from Rio de Janeiro (city)
Women in Latin music
People from Bedford Roxo